Sunaga (written: 須永 or 須長) is a Japanese surname. Notable people with the surname include:

, Japanese baseball player
, Japanese rower
, Japanese windsurfer

Japanese-language surnames